John Hodgson may refer to:
 John Hodgson (British Army officer) (1757–1846), British general
 John Hodgson (Australian politician) (1799–1860), Australian politician and mayor of Melbourne
 John Hodgson (antiquary) (1779–1845), English clergyman and antiquary
 John Evan Hodgson (1831–1895), English painter
 John Hodgson (footballer, born 1922) (1922–1973), English footballer for Leeds United and Middlesbrough
 John Hodgson (footballer, born 1900) (1900–1959), English football for Brentford
 John Hodgson (Wisconsin politician) (1812–1869), English-born Wisconsin politician
 John H. Hodgson, Canadian historian
 John Hodgson (actor), English stage actor
 John Barnet Hodgson (1819–1908), businessman and mayor of Ramsgate, England
 J. F. Hodgson (John Frederick Hodgson, 1867–1947), British socialist activist

See also
 Herbert John Hodgson (1893–1974), English printer
 Jack Hodgson (disambiguation)